Ralph George Watling (12 September 1872 – 10 May 1951) was a male badminton player from England.

Watling won the All England Open Badminton Championships in men's singles in 1902 and 1903.

References

All England champions 1899-2007

English male badminton players
1872 births
1951 deaths
Sportspeople from Great Yarmouth